Rukmini is a Hindu goddess and the first queen and chief wife of Krishna. In Vaishnava tradition, she is described as Krishna's principal queen in Dvaraka, as well as the chief of his wives. She is an incarnation of the goddess of prosperity, Lakshmi. The goddess is regarded to be the chief or principal consort of Krishna in various pieces of literature  and is venerated primarily in Warkari and Haridasa tradition, and additionally in Sri Vaishnavism where Lakshmi-Narayana are revered and worshipped. 

Rukmini is mainly worshipped in Maharashtra and South India. The people of Maharashtra venerate her with Vithoba (a regional form of Krishna) and call her Rakhumai. In South India, she is worshipped along with Krishna and his other primary consort Satyabhama.

Etymology and epithets

The name Rukmini is derived from the Sanskrit word Rukma which means 'Radiant', 'Clear' or 'Bright'. The name can also mean 'decorated with gold ornaments'. Other names and epithets include:
 Shree – Lakshmi, Goddess of Fortune
Ruciranana – One Who Has A Beautiful Face, Expanding Like A Lotus Flower
Vaidarbhi – She Who Is From The Kingdom Of Vidarbha.
 Bhaishmi – Daughter of Bhishmaka.
Rakhumai – Mother Rukmini.
Chiryauvana  – One Who Is Forever Young. 
Pradyumna Janani – Mother of Pradyumna.

Iconography 

According to the Vaikhanasagama, Rukmini should be depicted on the right side of Krishna, her image golden-yellow in complexion. Her hair is supposed to be tied up in a fashionable knot, and should also be adorned with flowers. Her right arm should be hanging down, and she should hold a lotus in her left hand. She is supposed to be adorned with various ornaments.

The Brahman dispatched by Rukmini to request Krishna to elope with her on her svayamvara describes the princess poetically as bearing beautiful hands, braided tresses, and a face that resembles the moon. She is consistently described as beautiful in other accounts.

In south Indian iconographic tradition, Rukmini, along with Satyabhama, appear as the primary consorts of Krishna.

Legend

According to the epic Mahabharata and other Puranic scriptures, Princess Rukmini was born to Bhishmaka—the king of Vidarbha kingdom—and had five elder brothers Rukmi, Rukmaratha, Rukmabahu, Rukmakesa and Rukmanetra. Many Puranas such as Vishnu Purana, Bhagavata Purana, and Padma Purana praise her as an incarnation of Goddess Lakshmi, the wife of the God Vishnu.

Marriage

The Bhagavata Purana narrates that Rukmini once heard about Krishna and his heroic deeds, such as slaying the tyrant king Kamsa, and opposing the evil king Jarasandha. She fell in love with him and desired to marry him. The episode of Rukmini Kalyanam, and the devotion of Rukmini towards her desired husband is narrated by the sage Shuka to King Parikshit.

Rukmini's parents rejoiced and gave their permission, but Rukmi – who was an ally of Jarasandha – strongly opposed it. Instead, he proposed that she be married to his friend Shishupala— the crown prince of Chedi Kingdom, and a cousin of Krishna. Bhishmaka agreed, and a distressed Rukmini immediately sent for a trusted Brahman and asked him to deliver a message to Krishna. In the message, she wrote to Krishna about her love and asked him to abduct her when she visited the temple of Goddess Ambika (Parvati) before her wedding. Krishna, having received the message in Dvaraka, told the messenger to inform Rukmini that he had received her letter and would come to make her his wife. Krishna then immediately set out for Vidarbha with Balarama, his elder brother.

Meanwhile, in Vidarbha's capital Kundina, Bhishmaka had prepared for Rukmini's marriage. Rukmini grew anxious as she observed the host of kings, wondering if the Brahman she had dispatched had not reached safely or not, and if the Almighty would assist her in her efforts. Her face grew pale and her thoughts grew distressed as she shunned herself from the rest of the world. Her sorrow of Krishna not having yet arrived to marry her yet was so immense that she refused to eat, sing to her parrot, or play her lyre. Shishupala, along with his allies including Jarasandha had arrived. Krishna and Balarama had also arrived, and Bhishmaka welcomed them. At the palace, Rukmini had lost all hope, but the messenger turned up and informed that Krishna had accepted her request. The next day, she went to the temple to offer her prayers to Ambika. As she proceeded towards the wedding venue, she saw Krishna and he soon swept her into his chariot with him. All of Jarasandha's forces quickly started chasing them, but they were repulsed by Balarama and his army.

Rukmi chased after Krishna and Rukmini. He challenged Krishna to a fight, but was easily overpowered by the former. Rukmini begged Krishna to spare her brother's life, and the latter agreed. However, he shaved Rukmi's hair and moustache as a mark of punishment, and let him go free. Krishna and Rukmini reached Dvaraka, where they were welcomed with great pomp and ceremony, followed by a wedding.

Krishna's Ruse
The Bhagavata Purana describes an episode through the sage Shuka where the yet unwed Rukmini takes a bejewelled whisk and starts fanning her prospective husband Krishna, wearing an expensive girdle and a dazzling necklace. Even though he is pleased, Krishna points to the fact that the princess had been desired by a number of handsome and energetic monarchs and states that he was not their equal, and that he had also almost lost his realm rescuing her. He remarks that she had not been far-sighted in choosing him as her groom and that she must now instead choose a Kshatriya like her. Rukmini's heart shuddered, her red nails scratched the floor, and tears flowed from her eyes that were decorated with collyrium. She fell to the floor, her hair dishevelled. Krishna swiftly raised her back to her feet and assures her that he was merely joking, as householders do with their beloved. Her fear of abandonment seeping away from her, the princess eulogises him, praising his glories and addressing him as her atman, her sense of self. Krishna praises her single-minded devotion to him.

Children
The Bhagavata Purana states that Rukmini and Krishna had ten sons—Pradyumna, Charudeshna, Sudeshna, Charudeha, Sucharu, Charugupta, Bhadracharu, Charuchandra, Vicharu, and Charu. In the Harivamsa, Rukmini's sons are Pradyumna, Charudeshna, Charuchandra, Charugarbha, Sudangstra, Druma, Sushena, Charugupta, Charuvinda, and Chharuvahu. A different listing is found in Anushasana Parva of the Mahabharata, where Pradyumna, Charudeshna, Sucharu, Charuvesa, Yasodhana, Charusravas, Charuyasas, and Sambhu are Rukmini's sons. These scriptures also mention that Rukmini had a daughter named Charumati.

Married life

Though Krishna married many other women, Rukmini remained his chief consort and the queen of Dvaraka. When she longed for a child, Krishna flew to Kailash upon his mount Garuda, and expressed his wife's desire to Shiva. Obliging, Shiva blessed Rukmini to be the bearer of the new incarnation of Kamadeva, whom he had previously immolated with his third eye. Thus was Pradyumna born. Many scriptures have mentioned that Rukmini and other wives of Krishna lived like sisters.

Tale of the Scales 
According to a folktale of Odisha, the divine sage Narada once arrived in Dvaraka and asked for Krishna to be given to him as alms. Krishna's queens requested him to take anything else and Narada asked them to give wealth equal to Krishna's weight. They arranged for a big scale (Tulabharama) to be put up. Satyabhama put all of her coins, gems and jewellery on the scale, but it doesn't budge. Other wives gave their jewels, but it was of no use. At last, Rukmini came and put a single leaf of Tulasi on the scale and chanted that it represented her love for Krishna. The scales then became balanced. Though this story is absent in the main scriptures pertaining to Krishna's life, it is often repeated to enunciate the worth of Rukmini's love over Satyabhama's material wealth. The only known versions of this story are from Padma Purana and Devi Bhagvata Purana, where Satyabhama succeeds in weighing Krishna normally with gold items.

Meeting Sudama 
In the Bhagavata Purana, another well-known incident in Rukmini's married life is narrated. When Krishna's childhood friend, Sudama, visited Dvaraka, Rukmini welcomed Sudama and gave him food. She and Krishna fanned him as he rested from his long journey. This type of devotion is a characteristic of Rukmini, an attribute of her that is prevalent.

Durvasa's Curse
According to the Skanda Purana, the famously short-tempered sage Durvasa met Krishna and Rukmini when he was on a pilgrimage. Durvasa asked the couple to be yoked onto his chariot while he held the reins. In the process of pulling the chariot forward, Rukmini grew exhausted and requested Krishna for water. Krishna struck his foot against the ground causing a spring of the Ganga river to appear. Observing her quench her thirst without seeking his permission, the infuriated Durvasa cursed her to be separated from her beloved Krishna. Rukmini grew perturbed and started to cry. To pacify her, Krishna blessed her with the boon that if his devotees were to only see him and not her, they would receive only half the merit.

Despite this consolation, Rukmini grew distressed due to her separation from her consort and fell unconscious. The sea-god and the sage Narada arrived to comfort her. Narada informed her that her husband - a manifestation of Vishnu - was the Supreme Being himself, he rhetorically wondered how she could expect to keep his company in an exclusive garden. The sea affirmed the divine sage's words, promising her that as the companion of Vishnu, she would always retain her permanence in his being. The goddess Bhagirathi, the personification of the Ganga, produced a richly-endowed forest on the spot, laden with fruits and flowers, quickly to be frequented by the inhabitants of Dvaraka. Durvasa vengefully burnt the forest with his powers. Rukmini grew depressed and contemplated suicide. Krishna arrived and stopped her. She felt ashamed and furious with herself even as her husband reassured her of his devotion. The repentant Durvasa begged Krishna to reunite with Rukmini, and the deity consented, blessing the sage with virtue as well as saluting the river Ganga, who then became the liberator of sorrows.

Death
After the disappearance of Krishna following the Yadu massacre in the Mausala Parva, Rukmini, along with Jambavati, self-immolated herself on the funeral pyre.

Literature 
Rukmini primarily appears in literature that may be classified under the epic Mahabharata and the Puranas, as well as occasionally being featured in regional Vaishnava texts.

The Brihad Bhagavatamrita offers the following adulations to Rukmini, identifying her with Lakshmi and Krishna as the Supreme God, the source of all avatars. It states that she assumes partial avatars to accompany Krishna's avatars like Vamana and serves Krishna as his "perfectly complete divine consort".

The Narada Purana instructs a devotee on the manner of offering worship to Krishna, offering precedence to the role of Rukmini in his devotion. Rukmini is worshipped with Krishna on his left-hand side; she is equated with Rajas.

The Skanda Purana describes the process of the worship of the goddess with Krishna. A devotee is said to acquire wish fulfillment, male progeny and physical beauty by pleasing Rukmini.

Worship and Influence 
The worship of Rukmini as the consort of Krishna precedes his association with his other consorts, including Radha. According to D.C. Sircar, a sculpture from Paharpur in northern Bengal, attributed to the sixth or seventh century, represents Krishna and his consort, which he concludes is likely Rukmini. Her identification with Radha is rendered unlikely by the historian, owing to the fact that, "we have no undoubted reference to Radha in genuine epigraphic or literary records of an early date".

Rukmini Ashtami 
Rukmini Ashtami is the occasion that celebrates the birthday of Rukmini, the chief wife of Krishna. Vaishnava Hindus worship Rukmini as an incarnation of the goddess Lakshmi. Her birthday is primarily celebrated by women, who venerate her, her husband, and her son. It is a day of fasting. Married women see that honouring Rukmini is a way to ensure conjugal happiness, and they also entreat her assistance in finding a proper spouse for their unwed daughters. Rukmini Ashtami is observed on the eighth day of the waning moon in the Hindu lunar month of Pausha (December—January on the Common Era calendar). Rukmini is acknowledged with special pujas and rituals in all of the temples dedicated to Krishna, especially those in those parts of India, especially associated with him such as Mathura and Vrindavan.

Veneration across India

Rukmini is mainly worshipped in west and south Indian states such as Gujarat, Maharashtra, Karnataka, Goa, Andhra Pradesh, Telangana, Tamil Nadu, and Kerala. Rukmini's kingdom, Vidarbha, is believed to be located in present-day Maharashtra. Along with Vithoba (a regional form of Krishna), Rukmini is worshipped as "Rakhumai" in the Pandharpur region. She is also worshipped in Pandava Thoothar Perumal Temple as the chief goddess, with Krishna being the primary deity.

The Mishmi people of Arunachal Pradesh believe that Rukmini belonged to their tribe. The plays and dances on 'Rukmini Haran' are common. There is a legend that Krishna asked the Mishmi people to cut their hair as a form of punishment for not allowing him to marry Rukmini. Due to this Idu-Mishmi people are also called "chulikata" (chuli-hair, kata- cut).

In 1480, the Vaishnava saint Vadiraja Tirtha (1480–1600) has composed a famous work Rukminisha Vijaya glorifying Rukmini and Krishna in 1241 verses spread over 19 chapters.

The Kantajew Temple at Kantanagar, is a late-medieval Hindu temple in Dinajpur, Bangladesh. The Kantajew Temple is one of the most magnificent religious edifices belonging to the 18th century. This beautiful temple is dedicated to Krishna and his wife Rukmini Built by Maharaja Pran Nath, its construction started in 1704 CE and ended in the reign of his son Raja Ramnath in 1722 CE. It boasts one of the greatest examples of terracotta architecture in Bangladesh and once had nine spires, but all were destroyed in an earthquake that took place in 1897.

Temples
 Rukmini Devi Temple, Dwaraka
 Tirumala Krishna Temple , Tirupati
 Vithoba Temple, Pandharpur 
 Pandava Thoothar Perumal Temple, Kanchipuram [ Divya Desam]
 Kantajew Temple, Bangladesh
 Thennangur Sri Rakhumai Sametha Panduranga Temple, Thiruvannamalai
 Sri Vittal Rakhumai Mandir, Dahisar
 Shri Vitthal Rukmini Temple, Thanjavur
 Sri Rukmini Panduranga Swamy Temple, Machilipatnam
 Vijaya Vitthala Mandhira, Hampi
 Iskcon temples - Iskcon Kaundanyapur, Iskcon Los Angeles, Iskcon Amravati, Iskcon Dwarka

Notes

References

Bibliography

External links

 Srimad-Bhagavatam: Krishna kidnaps Rukmini

Characters in the Mahabharata
Hindu goddesses
Lakshmi
Characters in the Bhagavata Purana
Consorts of Krishna